Keystones! is a jazz album by pianist Red Garland, recorded in 1977 for Xanadu Records at Keystone Korner in San Francisco, CA.

Track listing

Autumn Leaves
It's Impossible
Daahoud / New York (theme)
It's All Right With Me
On Green Dolphin Street / New York Theme (theme)

Personnel 

 Red Garland - piano
 Leroy Vinnegar - bassist
 Philly Joe Jones - drums

1977 live albums
Xanadu Records live albums
Red Garland live albums
Albums recorded at Keystone Korner